Jaxon is a given name and surname. Notable people with the name include:

Given name
Jaxon Benge, American guitarist
Jaxon Buell (2014–2020), American medical figure
Jaxon Crabb (born 1979), Australian rules footballer
Jaxon Evans (born 1996), New Zealand racing driver
Jaxon Lee (born 1968), American voice actor
Jaxon Smith-Njigba (born 2002), American football player
Jaxon Shipley (born 1992), American football player

Surname
David Jaxon or David Janson (born 1950), English actor 
Frankie Jaxon (c. 1896–1953), African-American vaudeville singer
Honoré Jaxon or Honoré Jackson (1861–1952), Canadian secretary to Louis Riel during the North-West Rebellion
Jay Jaxon (1941–2006), African-American fashion designer

Fictional characters
Jerry Jaxon, Marvel Comics
Peter Jaxon, Theo's younger brother in The Passage novel series
Theo Jaxon, Peter's older brother in The Passage novel series
Thunderbolt Jaxon, superhero comic-book character

See also
Eli Jaxon-Bear (born 1947), American-born spiritual teacher and author
Jaxson, given name
Jackson (name), given name and surname

English masculine given names
English-language surnames